Lukáš Vaculík (born 5 October 1986) is a Czech freestyle skier. He competed in the men's moguls event at the 2010 Winter Olympics.

References

External links
 

1986 births
Living people
Czech male freestyle skiers
Olympic freestyle skiers of the Czech Republic
Freestyle skiers at the 2010 Winter Olympics
People from Vítkov
Sportspeople from the Moravian-Silesian Region